Percival Guy Tunmer (1 December 1948 – 22 June 1999) was a racing driver from South Africa.  He participated in one Formula One World Championship Grand Prix, his home race in 1975, driving a Lotus 72 for a local team, Team Gunston.  He finished 11th, scoring no championship points.  He later found success in Formula Atlantic.

Guy Tunmer was killed in a motorcycle accident in his native South Africa in 1999.

Complete Formula One World Championship results
(key)

References

1948 births
1999 deaths
People from Ficksburg
South African racing drivers
South African Formula One drivers
Team Gunston Formula One drivers
Atlantic Championship drivers
Motorcycle road incident deaths
Road incident deaths in South Africa